Novska is a town in the Sisak-Moslavina County of Croatia. It is located in western part of the historic region of Slavonia, between Kutina and Nova Gradiška,  linear distance southeast of the capital, Zagreb.

Demographics
Novska has a total population of 13,518 in the following settlements:

 Bair, population 6
 Borovac, population 273
 Brestača, population 913
 Brezovac, population 9
 Bročice, population 964
 Jazavica, population 398
 Kozarice, population 433
 Kričke, population 23
 Lovska, population 9
 Nova Subocka, population 713
 Novi Grabovac, population 14
 Novska, population 7,028
 Paklenica, population 279
 Plesmo, population 87
 Popovac, population 10
 Rađenovci, population 2
 Rajčići, population 4
 Rajić, population 875
 Roždanik, population 262
 Sigetac, population 122
 Stara Subocka, population 502
 Stari Grabovac
 Voćarica, population 199

In the 2011 census, 91.64% (12,388) of the population were Croats and 4.74% (641) were Serbs. In 1991 in the town lived 24,696 inhabitants, Croats 16,556 (67.03%), Serbs 5,402 (21.87%), Yugoslavs 675 (2.73%), others 2,063 (8.35%).

History
Before 1881, Novska was part of the Austrian monarchy (Kingdom of Croatia-Slavonia after the compromise of 1867), in the Slavonian Military Frontier, Gradiskaner Regiment  N°VIII. Between 1881 and 1918, in the Požega County of the Kingdom.

During the Croatian War of Independence two separate mass murders of Serb civilians took place in the town. On 21 November 1991, four Serbs were tortured and killed. On 18 December 1991, four Serbs were shot with one managing to survive. In the first case, Croatian Army soldier Damir Vida Raguž was found guilty of war crimes in a first-instance verdict and sentenced to 20 years in prison, while the other accused, Željko Škledar was acquitted. The verdict was overturned however and following a re-trial, both were acquitted. In the second case, Željko Belina and Dejan Milić were sentenced by the Zagreb County Court to 10 and 9 years in prison, respectively, following a Supreme Court reversal of an earlier adjudication.

Transport and industry

The Croatian railway lines M103, M104 and M105 are connected with each other at the Novska railway station. All of them and the A3 motorway, which runs passes by south of the town, are part of Pan-European Corridor X. Novska is known for its steel elbow  factory, Metaflex.

References

External links

 
 Public open university Novska

Cities and towns in Croatia
Populated places in Sisak-Moslavina County
Požega County
Slavonia